Nicole Zuraitis is a Grammy-nominated American jazz vocalist, pianist, songwriter and arranger.

Biography

Early life

Nicole Zuraitis grew up in Connecticut and had an early gift for athletics, but suffered a hip flexor injury while playing youth soccer in France with the Olympic development soccer team.  She began to shift her focus towards singing as well as playing trombone and percussion. She attended Litchfield public schools as well as Holy Cross High School in Waterbury, Connecticut. Zuraitis began to sing jazz with a local community college big band after being encouraged by her high school music director. She also frequently attended Litchfield Jazz Camp, which she attributes to her early interest in jazz.

Zuraitis studied classical voice at New York University. After a brief period performing opera professionally after graduation, she moved back to the New York City to pursue songwriting and jazz in 2009.

Music career
Zuraitis released her first album Spread the Word in 2008, featuring Luques Curtis, Zaccai Curtis and Winard Harper.  Her most recent album All Wandering Hearts released in July 2020. Recent touring projects have included Generations of Her, featuring songs by female composers from 1924 to the present.

Zuraitis performs regularly with the Dan Pugach Nonet. In 2019, she and Pugach received a co-nomination for a Grammy Award for their arrangement of Dolly Parton's "Jolene." She has also been prominently featured with the Birdland Big Band in New York City. Her groups have performed regularly  at Greenwich Village's famed 55 Bar jazz club. She is a member of the Sonica trio, alongside Thana Alexa and Julia Adamy.  She has performed or collaborated with Tom Chapin, Morgan James, Livingston Taylor and Melanie Safka, Cyrille Aimee, Dave Stryker, Livingston Taylor, Omar Hakim, Helen Sung, Rachel Z, Tim Palmieri, Elise Testone, and Bernard Purdie, among others. Zuraitis has taught songwriting and jazz vocal workshops worldwide, including the Swamabhoomi Academy of Music in India, Israel Embassy, Australian consulate, Williams College, Miami Arts Charter School and the Berklee College of Music in Boston.

Forbes magazine featured Zuraitis' Covid crisis pivot project Virtual Piano Lounge Plus One in October 2020. Produced with Dan Pugach, the project offered performances through Facebook Live and featured a rotating cast of guests.

Awards

Zuraitis' performance of Dolly Parton’s Jolene (song) in collaboration with the Dan Pugach Nonet received a Grammy Award nomination in 2019 for Best Arrangement, Instruments and Vocals. She was hosted as a guest of honor by the WOW! forum in fall 2019.

In 2020, Broadway World nominated Zuraitis for five Cabaret Awards. Additionally, she was the 2016 Coffee Music Project New York Songwriting Project winner and 2015 runner-up in The Sarah Vaughan International Jazz Vocal Competition. Zuraitis was named in Connecticut Magazine's "40 under 40". She received the IMEA Best Jazz Album award, the Johnny Mercer Award in the American Traditions Competition and the Herb Alpert Young Jazz Composer award.

Personal life

Zuraitis married drummer and composer Dan Pugach in 2018.  They currently live in Brooklyn, New York.

Her album Hive Mind (DotTime Records) explores the nature of creativity and its associated challenges. The album is dedicated to her grandfather who has lived with schizophrenia for the majority of his life. In conjunction with this project, Zuraitis offered a portion of concert ticket sales to various mental health organizations with missions aimed at ending the mental health stigma. Additionally, her album Pariah Anthem depicts the plight of rescue animals, specifically pit bulls. She has performed at animal shelters across America to help raise awareness and spread education about the breed through music.

Discography

As leader
 All Wandering Hearts (DotTime Records, 2020)
 Live at Two-Headed Calf - with Brandon Scott Coleman (2018)
 Hive Mind (DotTime Records, 2017)
 Long Meadow Vine (The Wine Song) - single (DotTime Records, 2017)
 No Ban, No Wall - single (2017)
 For the Lonely - single (2014)
 Pariah Anthem - (2013)
 Spread the Word (2008)

As guest
Ona – Thana Alexa (Independent, 2020)
All About Love – Elise Testone (2020)
Plus One – Dan Pugach Nonet (Unit Records, 2018)
Day Dream – Carmen Staaf Sextet (2017)
Wishes on a Neon Sign – Abbie Gardner (2017)
Come to Paradise – Suzanne Dean (2016)
Sealine Woman – With Nikki and The Riot (2016)
Right Here – Andrea Daly (2016)
Take Some Air – EVA (Independent, 2015)
Something New – Jennifer Sullivan (Independent, 2014)

References

External links 

Living people
American women jazz singers
American jazz singers
Women jazz musicians
21st-century American singers
21st-century American women singers
Year of birth missing (living people)